The United Wrestling Coalition (UWC) Heavyweight Championship is a professional wrestling championship in the American independent professional wrestling promotion United Wrestling Coalition.  Being a professional wrestling championship, it is not won via direct competition; it is instead won via a predetermined ending to a match or awarded to a wrestler because of a wrestling angle.  It became an official title on March 21, 1998 when Derik Starr became the first champion.  The championship is held by Tony Chini, who is in his first reign as champion.  There have been 33 reigns by 27 wrestlers and five vacancies.

Title lineage

List of combined reigns

See also
UWC Tag Team Championship
UWC United States Championship
List of UWC Championships

References

Heavyweight wrestling championships
United Wrestling Coalition championships